Tiny Toon Adventures: ACME All-Stars is a Tiny Toon Adventures-based sports video game released on the Sega Genesis video game console. The game was developed and published by Konami in 1994.

Gameplay
Similar to Tiny Toon Adventures: Wacky Sports Challenge released on both the Super NES and the Game Boy, ACME All-Stars is a sports title that allows the player to make a team out of several iconic characters from the show, which include Buster Bunny, Babs Bunny, Plucky Duck, Hamton J. Pig, Montana Max (aka Monty), Elmyra Duff, Shirley McLoon, Fifi La Fume, Calamity Coyote, Little Beeper, Furrball and Dizzy Devil.

There are five different games to choose from including basketball, soccer, bowling, an obstacle course race, and "Montana Hitting", a variant of whack-a-mole. In basketball and soccer, five separate themes are available for the respective sports court or field, one standard, and four variants with different obstacles placed in the playing area.

Reception
Paul Bufton and Gus Swan reviewed the game for Mean Machines Sega magazine, Bufton noted the game featured an "unusual combination of fluffy cartoon characters and a challenging difficulty level" while Swan felt it lacked "any real feel or gameplay sophistication". The publication awarded the game a score of 78/100.

References

External links

Sega-16 Review Review of the game.

1994 video games
Konami games
Sega Genesis games
Sega Genesis-only games
Video games based on Tiny Toon Adventures
Multiplayer and single-player video games
Video games developed in Japan